Amrita Arora Ladak  (born 31 January 1981) is an Indian actress, model, television presenter and video jockey (VJ), who primarily appears in Hindi-language films.

Personal life and education
She completed her secondary education from Swami Vivekanand School in Chembur. Her aunt, Grace Polycarp, was the principal of the school, Mumbai. 

She is married to Shakeel Ladak, a businessman in the construction industry in 2009. The ceremonies included a Christian wedding on 4 March 2009 followed by Mehendi on 5 March and a Muslim Nikah ceremony on 6 March 2009. They have two sons named Azaan (born on 5 February 2010) and Rayaan (born on 20 October 2012).

Career
Arora started her career as VJ for MTV. She made her Bollywood debut in 2002 opposite Fardeen Khan in the film, Kitne Door Kitne Paas, which was not successful at the box office. Her first successful film was the action comedy, Awara Paagal Deewana. A series of flops followed, among them Girlfriend (2004), about a lesbian relationship, in which she appeared opposite Isha Koppikar.

In 2007, she made a special appearance in Farah Khan's film Om Shanti Om, in the song "Deewangi Deewangi" with her sister and former brother-in-law Arbaaz Khan. In the same year, she appeared in Speed and Red: The Dark Side, also starring Aftab Shivdasani and Celina Jaitley.

In 2009, her releases were Deha and Team the Force. The same year, she appeared in a supporting role in Kambakth Ishq, produced by Sajid Nadiadwala.

Filmography

References

External links

 
 

1981 births
Living people
Actresses from Mumbai
Female models from Mumbai
Indian film actresses
Indian voice actresses
Actresses in Hindi cinema
Actresses in Urdu cinema
Malayali people
Punjabi people
Indian Roman Catholics
Indian VJs (media personalities)
Indian expatriate actresses in Pakistan
21st-century Indian actresses